A combinator library is a software library which implements combinators for a functional programming language; "the key idea is this: a combinator library offers functions (the combinators) that combine functions together to make bigger functions". These kinds of libraries are particularly useful for allowing domain-specific programming languages to be easily embedded into a general purpose language by defining a few primitive functions for the given domain and turning over the task of expanding higher-level constructs to the general language. An example would be the monadic Parsec parser  for Haskell. The library approach allows the parsers to be first-class citizens of the language.

See also
 Run-time system
 QuickCheck
Point-free style programming

References

External links
 
 
 

Application programming interfaces